Michela Zanatta (born 17 May 1971) is a former Italian female middle-distance runner who competed at two editions of the IAAF World Cross Country Championships at senior level (2004, 2005).

Biography
She won five national championships at senior level.

National titles
Italian Athletics Indoor Championships
1500 m: 2003, 2004
3000 m: 2001, 2003, 2004

References

External links
 

1978 births
Living people
Italian female middle-distance runners
Italian female cross country runners
Athletics competitors of Gruppo Sportivo Esercito